General elections were held in Nepal on 12 May 1986 to elect members of the Rastriya Panchayat. As political parties were banned at the time, all 1,548 candidates ran as independents. Voter turnout was 60.3%.

Results

See also
List of members elected in the 1986 Nepalese general election

References

Nepal
1986 elections in Nepal
General elections in Nepal
General
Non-partisan elections
Nepal